Tommi Kivistö (born June 7, 1991) is a Finnish professional ice hockey defenceman. He is  currently playing for Jokerit of the Kontinental Hockey League (KHL).

Playing career
Kivisto initially played junior then professionally in his native Finland for Jokerit in the SM-liiga. He was drafted 208th overall in the 2009 NHL Entry Draft by the Carolina Hurricanes. Prior to the 2011–12 season with Jokerit, he was signed to a three-year entry level contract with the Hurricanes on June 1, 2011.

Kivisto played two seasons in the KHL with Russian club, Avtomobilist Yekaterinburg, before his rights were traded in opting to return to original club, Jokerit on a two-year contract on May 30, 2017.

Career statistics

Regular season and playoffs

International

References

External links

1991 births
Living people
Avtomobilist Yekaterinburg players
Carolina Hurricanes draft picks
Charlotte Checkers (2010–) players
Finnish ice hockey defencemen
Florida Everblades players
Ilves players
Jokerit players
Kiekko-Vantaa players
Ice hockey players at the 2018 Winter Olympics
Olympic ice hockey players of Finland
Red Deer Rebels players
Sportspeople from Vantaa